Xiaori Island is an island off the Asian mainland in Xiaori Village, Nanri Town, Xiuyu District, Putian, Fujian, China (PRC).

On the night of January 1, 2020, the fishing ship Zhecangyu 07868 struck a rock near Xiaori Island. The ten crew members were rescued.

Gallery
Maps including Xiaori Island:

See also
 List of islands of China

References

Islands of Fujian
Villages in China
Putian
Taiwan Strait
Uninhabited islands of China
Islands of China